The 1918 Mather Field football team represented Mather Field, located near Sacramento, California, during the 1918 college football season. Former Pittsburgh back Jimmy DeHart played for Camp Mather in 1918. He also served as the coach.

The Spanish flu pandemic derailed the team's original schedule, and the team's manager had difficulty scheduling opponents after the pandemic subsided.

Schedule

References

Mather Field
Mather Field football